Esteban Reyes (22 July 1913 – 19 March 2014) also known as  was a Mexican tennis player who represented his country during the 1935 International Lawn Tennis Challenge (nowadays known as the Davis Cup) and won a silver medal during the 1935 Central American and Caribbean Games.

See also
List of Mexico Davis Cup team representatives

References

Mexican male tennis players
Sportspeople from Michoacán
1913 births
2014 deaths
Mexican centenarians
Central American and Caribbean Games medalists in tennis
Central American and Caribbean Games gold medalists for Mexico
Central American and Caribbean Games silver medalists for Mexico
Central American and Caribbean Games bronze medalists for Mexico
Men centenarians
20th-century Mexican people